= Silasindurighopa =

- village
- Country: India
- State: Assam

Government
  - Body: Gram panchayat

Languages
  - Official: Assamese
- Time zone: UTC+5:30 (IST)
- Vehicle registration: AS

Silasindurighopa is a Mouza under greater Guwahati city.
